Sepp Puchinger (22 December 1948 – 7 March 1984) was an Austrian rower. He competed in the men's double sculls event at the 1972 Summer Olympics.

References

1948 births
1984 deaths
Austrian male rowers
Olympic rowers of Austria
Rowers at the 1972 Summer Olympics
People from Krems an der Donau
Sportspeople from Lower Austria